The Church of St Mary in Wedmore, Somerset, England is predominantly from the 15th century, although some 12th- and 13th-century work survives. It has been designated as a Grade I listed building.

The tower, which was built around 1400, with its set-back buttresses, includes triple two-light bell chamber windows; those to the centre are louvred, those to each side blank.

External links 
Web address : https://www.achurchnearyou.com/church/10871/

Face book page: https://www.facebook.com/St-Marys-Wedmore-384215139101196/

See also

 List of Grade I listed buildings in Sedgemoor
 List of towers in Somerset
 List of ecclesiastical parishes in the Diocese of Bath and Wells

References

15th-century church buildings in England
Church of England church buildings in Sedgemoor
Grade I listed churches in Somerset
Grade I listed buildings in Sedgemoor